Mission Nuestra Señora de la Asunción de Zía was a Spanish Mission in the area that is now New Mexico. It was established in 1706.

The area had been visited by the Spanish in the 16th century. The site was where a mass baptism of Zia Pueblo residents took place following the Pueblo Revolt of 1680, following the return of the Spanish.

See also
 Spanish missions in New Mexico
 Pueblo Revolt

External links
 Nuestra Señora de la Asunción in Zia Pueblo
New Mexico Tourism on Nuestra Señora de la Asunción de Zia
Sunlight and Adobe - Photographing New Mexico's Historic Missions New Mexico Photography Field School
History, Archdiocese of Santa Fe
Catholic Encyclopedia article on New Mexico Missions

1706 establishments in New Spain
Spanish missions in New Mexico